Kim Clijsters and Ai Sugiyama were the defending champions, but none competed this year. Clijsters was injured on her left wrist, while Sugiyama decided to focus on the singles tournament.

Cara Black and Rennae Stubbs won the title by defeating Virginia Ruano Pascual and Paola Suárez 6–4, 6–4 in the final.

Seeds

Draw

Draw

References

External links
 Official results archive (ITF)
 Official results archive (WTA)

2004 Doubles
Swisscom Challenge - Doubles